Shamsul Hoque Khan School and College (Bengali: সামসুল হক খান স্কুল এন্ড কলেজ) is a private school and college in the Demra area of Dhaka. It is named after Philanthropist Shamsul Hoque Khan who helped to the establishment of the institution.

History 
Shamsul Hoque Khan School & College is one of the largest educational institutions at Demra Thana. The institute began as Shamsul Hoque Khan Junior High School in 1989. The High school section was instigated in 1995. The institution currently have more than 15,000 students and 300 Teachers. In 2015, the school attained first position in the SSC examination in national leaderboard. It commenced its English Version in 2014.

Academics

High school 

 Humanities
 Science 
 Business studies

College 

 Humanities
 Science 
 Business studies

References

External links 
Official Website

Universities and colleges in Dhaka
Colleges in Dhaka District
Educational institutions established in 1989
Private colleges in Bangladesh
1989 establishments in Bangladesh